Galijula is an uninhabited isle in the southwestern Adriatic Sea, 3 nautical miles from the island of Palagruža. It belongs to the municipality of Komiža in Split-Dalmatia County, Croatia. It is the southernmost point of Croatia.

References

Islands of the Adriatic Sea
Uninhabited islands of Croatia
Landforms of Split-Dalmatia County